Selçuk Çebi (born June 3, 1982 in Araklı, Trabzon Province, Turkey) is a Turkish wrestler. He is a three-time world champion in Greco-Roman wrestling. He studied at Ondokuz Mayıs University.

While receiving secondary education at İmam Hatip Lisesi in his native Araklı, Çebi was advised by his father to sign up for wrestling at age 12. He became the only professional wrestler in the family of seven children. Çebi graduated from the College of Physical Education of the Ondokuz Mayıs University in Samsun, after which he practiced wrestling at the Trabzon Belediyespor and Çaykur Rizespor. He obtained his license at the İstanbul Büyükşehir Belediyesi S.K., but continued to train in Trabzon.

He won a gold medal for Turkey at the 2005 Mediterranean Games held in Almería, where he competed at 66 kg.

He became a gold-medal winner in 74 kg at the 2009 World Wrestling Championships held in Herning.

Selçuk Çebi is officially sponsored by Herbalife.

He is married to Kübra Çebi and has a son named Yusuf.

Results
 2005 Summer Universiade – Gold medal
 Round 1: Bye
 Round 2: Defeated , 2–0
 Round 3: Defeated , 2–0
 Semifinal: Defeated , 2–1
 Final: Defeated , 2–0
 2009 European Wrestling Championships – Bronze medal
 Round 1: Defeated , 2–0
 Round 2: Defeated , 2–0
 Round 3: Defeated , 2–0
 Bronze Medal Final: Defeated , 2–0
 2010 World Championship – Gold medal
 Round 1: Bye
 Round 2: Defeated , 2–0 (2–0, 2–0)
 Round 3: Defeated , 2–1 (0–1, 1–0, 1–0)
 Round 4: Defeated , 2–1 (0–1, 1–0, 1–0)
 Semifinal: Defeated , 2–0 (6–0, 1–0)
 Final: Defeated , 2–1 (0–1, 1–0, 1–0)

References

External links
 

1982 births
Living people
People from Araklı
Olympic wrestlers of Turkey
Wrestlers at the 2012 Summer Olympics
Imam Hatip school alumni
Ondokuz Mayıs University alumni
European Games competitors for Turkey
Wrestlers at the 2015 European Games
Turkish male sport wrestlers
World Wrestling Championships medalists
Wrestlers at the 2016 Summer Olympics
Mediterranean Games gold medalists for Turkey
Competitors at the 2005 Mediterranean Games
Competitors at the 2013 Mediterranean Games
Universiade medalists in wrestling
Mediterranean Games medalists in wrestling
Universiade gold medalists for Turkey
Medalists at the 2005 Summer Universiade
21st-century Turkish people
20th-century Turkish people